Broadway Play Publishing Inc (BPPI) was established in New York City in 1982 to publish and license the stage performance rights of contemporary American plays. The Broadway Play Publishing Inc catalog consists of over 1,000 plays and nearly 400 authors, such as: Constance Congdon, María Irene Fornés, A. R. Gurney, Tony Kushner, Neil LaBute, Richard Nelson, Eric Overmyer, José Rivera, Naomi Wallace, and many others. Its authors have been produced on Broadway and Off, in London's West End, and in theaters across the United States and around the world. They have won Nobel Prizes, Pulitzer Prizes, Tony Awards, Obie Awards, the MacArthur Genius Grant, Guggenheim Fellowships, and National Endowment for the Arts grants. Christopher W D Gould, Publisher. Michael Q Fellmeth, Executive Director.

Playwrights

JoAnne Akalaitis
Phil Austin
Thomas Babe
Eric Bentley
Glen Berger
Peter Bergman
Brooke Berman
Alan Bowne
Victor Bumbalo
Jack Canfora
Steve Carter
Suzy McKee Charnas
Robert Chesley
Anthony Clarvoe
Daniel Damiano
Christopher Denham
Charles Evered
María Irene Fornés
Judy GeBauer
Anthony Giardina
Jeff Goode
David Greenspan
A. R. Gurney
Mark Harelik
Allan Havis
Davey Holmes
Willy Holtzman
CJ Hopkins
Tom Jacobson
Sherry Kramer
Tony Kushner
Neil LaBute
Elaine Lee
Adam Long
Emily Mann
Marlane Meyer
Richard Nelson
Brett Neveu
Qui Nguyen
Dan O'Brien
David Ossman
Eric Overmyer
Rochelle Owens
Robert Patrick
Sybille Pearson
John Pielmeier
Phil Proctor
Frank Pugliese
Aishah Rahman
Adam Rapp
Phil Reeves
José Rivera
Jonathan J. Samarro
Anne Sexton
Betty Shamieh
Daniel Singer
Bryan Stubbles
Joe Sutton
Daniel Therriault
Megan Terry
Trish Vradenburg
Naomi Wallace
David Wiltse
Jess Winfield
•  Joe Pintauro

Plays

Angels In America
Autobahn
Bash: Latter-Day Plays
A Bright Room Called Day
Cloud Tectonics
The Complete Works of William Shakespeare (Abridged)
Crazy Mary
Day of the Dog
Far East
Fat Pig
Fefu and Her Friends
The Illusion
In a Dark Dark House
Indian Blood (play)
The Mercy Seat
More Lies About Jerzy
On The Verge
One Flea Spare
Pecong
Post Mortem
Sarita
The Shape of Things
Slaughter City
Slavs!
Some Girl(s)
Starstruck
This Is How It Goes
To Gillian On Her 37th Birthday
Underneath the Lintel
Viet Rock
Wrecks

External links

Publishing companies based in New York City
Publishing companies established in 1982
1982 establishments in New York City
American companies established in 1982